Richie Ray & Bobby Cruz are a Puerto Rican musical duo, consisting of Ricardo "Richie" Ray and Roberto "Bobby" Cruz. The duo was formed in 1963 and rose to fame in the mid-1960s. They are one of the most famous interpreters of 'salsa brava' music.

The duo is well known for helping to establish the popularity of salsa music in the 1960s and 1970s. They are also notable for fusioning elements of classical music and rock with traditional Latin music. Among their biggest hits were "Richie's Jala Jala", "Agúzate", "El Sonido Bestial", and "Bomba Camará". They are also famous for their Christmas songs "Seis chorreao", "Bomba en Navidad", and "Bella es la Navidad".

The duo was popular from 1965 to 1974 throughout Latin America and the United States, specially in Caribbean countries. In 1974, following a conversion to Evangelicalism and the inclusion of religious themes in the song's lyrics, the duo's popularity fell. The group continued releasing albums but broke up in the 1990s. In 1999, they reunited, and they have been touring and releasing new albums since then.

In November 2006, the Latin Academy of Recording Arts & Sciences gave Richie Ray & Bobby Cruz a Lifetime Achievement Award.

Discography

This is an incomplete list of albums released by Richie Ray & Bobby Cruz, solo albums by either artist are excluded from the list.
 Ricardo Ray Introduces Bobby Cruz A Go-Go-Go (1966)
 Sings For Lovers & Swingers (1967)
 Jala Jala y Boogaloo (1967)
 Jala Jala Boogaloo Volume II (1968)
 Los Durísimos (The Strong Ones)  (1968)
 Los Diferentes En Puerto Rico (1968)
 Let's Get Down to the Real Nitty Gritty (1968)
 Viva Ricardo (1968)
 El Diferente (1969)
 3 Dimensions (1969)
 Agúzate (1970)
 In Orbit (1971)
 El Bestial Sonido de Ricardo Ray Y Bobby Cruz (1971)
 Jammin' Live (1971)
 Ricardo Ray Presenta A "La Vimari (1972)
 Canta para ti (1972)
 1975 (1974)
 10 Aniversario (1975)
 Algo Nuevo (1976)
 Felices pascuas (1976)
 Reconstrucción (1976)
 Un sonido bestial (live) en Puerto Rico (1977)
 Viven (1977)
 The Best of Ricardo Ray & Bobby Cruz (1977)
 A su nombre Gloria (1978)
 De nuevo los Durísimos, Again (1980)
 El sonido de la bestia (1980)
 Pinturas (1981)
 Back to Back (1982)
 Las Aguilas-The Eagles (1982)
 Los Durísimos (1982)
 En familia (1983)
 Más que vencedores (1984)
 Los Inconfundibles (1987)
 Adelante Juventud (Con Jeff Morales) (1988)
 Un Sonido Bestial: El Concierto (1999)
 Mambo Tata (1999)
 Lo nuevo y lo mejor (2001)
 40 Aniversario (2005)
 Que vuelva la música (2005)
 Pura salsa (2007)

References

Salsa music groups
Musical groups established in 1964
1964 establishments in New York City
American musical duos
Musical groups from New York City
Latin Grammy Lifetime Achievement Award winners